The Tivoli River is an  primarily tidal river in Bryan County, Georgia, in the United States. It flows into the Belfast River, just north of that river's terminus at the Medway River, an arm of the Atlantic Ocean.

See also
List of rivers of Georgia

References 

USGS Hydrologic Unit Map - State of Georgia (1974)

Rivers of Georgia (U.S. state)
Rivers of Bryan County, Georgia